The Polar Bears is a 2012 3D computer animated short film presented by The Coca-Cola Company, produced by Ridley Scott, written by David Reynolds, and directed by John Stevenson. The film features the voices of Lin-Manuel Miranda, Armie Hammer, Jonathan Adams, and Megyn Price.  The film is based on Coca-Cola's iconic polar bears and was released on the company's website and YouTube channel on December 31, 2012.

Plot
Kaskae leads his family of polar bears across the Arctic Circle to give a speech to other polar bears. Jak, the troublemaker in the family, is given the task of looking after his little sister Kaia along with his elder brother Zook. Hearing part of Kaskae's speech about reaching new heights, Jak rushes to the peak of the tundra with Zook trailing him. As soon as both brothers reach the top, Jak shoves Zook before they both slide down and crash their father's speech. The family then discovers an unattended Kaia dancing with a flock of puffins. The other polar bears are not amused by the scene, as their kind are not supposed to socialize with the puffins, but Jak jumps in the water to join in the fun. Kaskae then orders everyone to be silent before he and the rest of the family jump in to play in the water.

Cast
 Lin-Manuel Miranda as Jak
 Armie Hammer as Zook
 Jonathan Adams as Kaskae
 Megyn Price as Sakari
 Lola Augspurger as Kaia
 Jenna Lamia as Polar Girl 1
 Anne Gregory as Polar Girl 2

References

External links
  (Coca-Cola)
  (Animal Logic)
 

2012 films
2010s American animated films
2012 3D films
2012 animated films
American animated short films
Animated films about bears
Animated films about birds
Films directed by John Stevenson
Films scored by Edward Shearmur
Films about polar bears
Films set in the Arctic
Promotional campaigns by Coca-Cola
Scott Free Productions films
Animal Logic films
American 3D films
Computer-animated short films
3D animated short films
Works based on advertisements
2010s English-language films